Leader otherwise known as lLeader area, or LA, is an unincorporated community in Cass County, Minnesota, United States, near Motley. It is along Highway 64 (MN 64) near 76th Street SW. 

Leader is known regionally for its draw to outdoor enthusiasts, including the Snoway 1 trailhead, as well as its relative isolation from the nearest incorporated community.

References

Unincorporated communities in Cass County, Minnesota
Unincorporated communities in Minnesota